Yongjia County (Wenzhou dialect: yon2ko1/ yu3 ion ko) is a county in Wenzhou in the southeast of Zhejiang province, People's Republic of China, located  north of the city proper of Wenzhou city, which administers the county. The Nanxi River Scenic Area is located within this county, and the river has been nominated on the tentative list of UNESCO World Heritage Sites.

Administrative divisions
Subdistricts of the Shangtang Administrative Committee:
Beicheng Subdistrict, Dongcheng Subdistrict, Nancheng Subdistrict

Subdistricts of the Oubei Administrative Committee:

Dong'ou Subdistrict, Jiangbei Subdistrict, Huangtian Subdistrict, Sanjiang Subdistrict, Wuniu Subdistrict

Towns:
Qiaotou, Qiaoxia, Shatou, Bilian, Xunzhai, Yantou, Fenglin, Yantan, Daruoyan, Hesheng

Climate

References

 
County-level divisions of Zhejiang
Geography of Wenzhou